"Racks in the Middle" is a song by American rapper Nipsey Hussle featuring American rapper Roddy Ricch and record producer Hit-Boy, released on February 15, 2019, through All Money In and Atlantic Records. It is the last single Hussle released during his lifetime, as he was shot dead on March 31, 2019. The song received nominations for Best Rap Song and Best Rap Performance at the 62nd Annual Grammy Awards, winning the latter. The award marked Hussle's first Grammy win, with his family and his partner Lauren London accepting the award on his behalf.

Background 
In an interview, Roddy Ricch said the song was initially only a collaboration between him and the song's producer Hit-Boy. He said Nipsey Hussle then heard the song and said he wanted it. Ricch recalls not liking the song at first, but putting his trust in Hussle who later claimed that "the streets are going to feel that shit".

Critical reception
Rolling Stone called the track atypical of Hussle's discography, saying his collaboration with Ricch and Hit-Boy resulted in a "more radio-friendly sound", but with "radical honesty" in its lyrics, which detail Hussle speaking to rap artist Tee Ran.

Music video
The music video was released to Hussle's YouTube channel on February 22, 2019, a week after the song's release, and features Hussle and Ricch rapping in front of women, various locations and luxury cars. Analysis of the video seems to show he’s speaking to someone directly as said by him in his famous interview with Rap Genius, Billboard described the video as "lavish".

Commercial performance
Following Hussle's death, his music sales increased by close to 3,000% and his streams increased by 1,773% in the United States, with "Racks in the Middle" accumulating 3,000 units, or 11.8 million streams. This led to the song being one of four songs by the rapper to posthumously debut on the Billboard Hot 100, with "Racks in the Middle" becoming his highest-charting as a lead artist.

Charts

Weekly charts

Year-end charts

Certifications

References

2019 singles
2019 songs
Grammy Award for Best Rap Performance
Nipsey Hussle songs
Roddy Ricch songs
Songs written by Hit-Boy
Songs written by Roddy Ricch
Songs written by Nipsey Hussle